The Gaulish name Cenomani can refer to:

 Aulerci Cenomani, an ancient Gallic tribe dwelling around modern Le Mans
 Cenomani (Cisalpine Gaul), an ancient Gallic tribe dwelling in Cisalpine Gaul
 Cenomani (Narbonensis), an ancient Gallic tribe dwelling near modern Marseille